Lockington may refer to:

Placenames
Lockington, East Riding of Yorkshire, England
Lockington rail crash, 1986 derailment in the East Riding of Yorkshire
Lockington railway station, former station in the East Riding of Yorkshire
Lockington-Hemington, Leicestershire, England
Lockington, Leicestershire, a village in the parish of Lockington-Hemington
Lockington, Ohio
Lockington, Victoria

Surname
Andrew Lockington (born 1974), Canadian film score composer
David Lockington (born 1956), music director of the Grand Rapids Symphony
William Neale Lockington (1840-1902), English zoologist